Radoslava Georgieva (born 1 April 1976) is a Bulgarian diver. She competed in the women's 10 metre platform event at the 1996 Summer Olympics.

References

1976 births
Living people
Bulgarian female divers
Olympic divers of Bulgaria
Divers at the 1996 Summer Olympics
Sportspeople from Sofia